Bezirk Rohrbach is a district in the state of Upper Austria in Austria.

Municipalities
Towns (Städte) are indicated in boldface; market towns (Marktgemeinden) in italics; suburbs, hamlets and other subdivisions of a municipality are indicated in small characters.
Afiesl
Ahorn
Aigen-Schlägl
Altenfelden
Arnreit
Atzesberg
Auberg
Haslach an der Mühl
Helfenberg
Hofkirchen im Mühlkreis
Hörbich
Julbach
Kirchberg ob der Donau
Klaffer am Hochficht
Kleinzell im Mühlkreis
Kollerschlag
Lembach im Mühlkreis
Lichtenau im Mühlkreis
Nebelberg
Neufelden
Neustift im Mühlkreis
Niederkappel
Niederwaldkirchen
Oberkappel
Oepping
Peilstein im Mühlviertel
Pfarrkirchen im Mühlkreis
Putzleinsdorf
Rohrbach-Berg
Sankt Johann am Wimberg
Sankt Martin im Mühlkreis
Sankt Oswald bei Haslach
Sankt Peter am Wimberg
Sankt Stefan am Walde
Sankt Ulrich im Mühlkreis
Sankt Veit im Mühlkreis
Sarleinsbach
Schwarzenberg am Böhmerwald
Ulrichsberg

References

 
Districts of Upper Austria